The following is a timeline of the history of the city of Montevideo, Uruguay.

18th century

 1724 – Ciudad Vieja, Montevideo (Historic City Centre) founded.
 1726 – Settlement established by Spaniard Bruno Mauricio de Zabala.
 1778 – Free port status acquired.
 1797 – 31 August: British ship Lady Shore arrives in harbour.

19th century

 1804 – Montevideo Metropolitan Cathedral consecrated.
 1807
 3 February: City besieged by British forces; British take city.
 Printing press in operation.
 Southern Star newspaper in publication.
 September: British occupation ends.
 1811 – Siege of Montevideo by forces of the United Provinces of the River Plate.
 1812
 Montevideo Cabildo built.
 Siege of Montevideo (1812-1814) begins.
 1814 – Siege ends; Spanish loyalists surrender.
 1817 – 20 January: city occupied by Luso-Brazilian forces.
 1821 – City becomes part of Brazilian province Cisplatina.
 1823 – Siege of Montevideo (1823)
 1825 – Hospital de Caridad founded.
 1828
 City becomes capital of independent Oriental Republic of Uruguay.
 British Cemetery established.
 1829 – City wall dismantled.
 ca.1830 - Plaza Independencia established
 1830 – National museum founded.
 1833 – Public library founded.
 1840 - Plaza de Cagancha named.
 1843 – Great Siege of Montevideo begins.
 1847 – Anglican church built.
 1849 – University of the Republic founded.
 1851 – Great Siege of Montevideo ends.
 1856
 Solís Theatre built.
 Salesas convent founded.
 Epidemic.
 1857 – British hospital founded.
 1858 – Church of the Immaculate Conception built.
 1862 – Hotel Oriental built.
 1863 – Bolsa (exchange) built.
 1866 – Post office built.
 1868 – Mercado del Puerto built.
 1871 – Teatro Cibils inaugurated.
 1874 – Estévez Palace built.
 1876 – Punta Brava Lighthouse erected.
 1879 – Population: 91,167.
 1880 – Nuevo Teatro San Felipe opens.
 1885 – Escuela Brasil (school) established.
 1889 – Teatro Nuevo Politeama inaugurated.
 1895 – Teatro Stella d'Italia founded.
 1900 – Estadio Gran Parque Central opens.

20th century

 1905 – Teatro Urquiza inaugurated.
 1906 – Electric streetcar begins operating.
 1908
 Municipality of Montevideo created.
 Daniel Muñoz becomes Intendant of Montevideo.
 Immigrants' Hotel opens.
 Edificio London París completed.
 Population: 312,946.(estimate).
 1909 – Urbano hotel in business.
 1910 – Teatro 18 de Julio opens.
 1911
 National Museum of Visual Arts (Uruguay) inaugurated.
 May: General strike.
 1913 – Villa del Cerro and La Teja become part of city.
 1924 - Nuestra Señora del Carmen, Cordón, Montevideo current church built.
 1925 – Palacio Legislativo (Uruguay) built.
 1928 - Palacio Salvo finished.
 1930
 Estadio Centenario opens.
 July: 1930 FIFA World Cup held.
 Juan Manuel Blanes Museum established.
 Obelisk of Montevideo built.
 Port of Montevideo major engineering works completed. 
 1933
 International Conference of American States held; Montevideo Convention on the Rights and Duties of States signed.
 Edificio Lapido built.
 1935 – Asociación de Arte Constructivo founded.
 1941 – City Hall of Montevideo built.
 1945 – Cine Trocadero opens (approximate date).
 1947 – Airport terminal inaugurated.
 1952 – Cinemateca Uruguaya (film archive) founded.
 1953 – Museo Torres García opens.
 1956 – Cilindro Municipal (arena) opens.
 1958 – Museum and Municipal Archives inaugurated in the Cabildo.
 1963 – Population: 1,154,465.
 1964 – Edificio Panamericano (residential building) constructed.
 1973 – 27 June: 1973 Uruguayan coup d'état.
 1975 – Population: 1,229,748.
 1983 – September: Labor demonstration.
 1985 – Liberty Building (Montevideo) built.
 1988 – May: Pope John Paul II visits city.
 1990
 Tabaré Vázquez elected mayor.
 City administration partially decentralized.
 1991 – Population: 1,360,258.
 1992 – Sarandi street pedestrianized.
 1995 – 23 July: 1995 Copa América Final football tournament held.

21st century

 2007 – Mercosur headquartered in city.
 2008 – Executive Tower, Montevideo built.
 2009 – Carrasco International Airport expands.
 2010 – Ana Olivera becomes Intendant of Montevideo.
 2011 – Population: 1,319,108.
 2015 – Daniel Martínez becomes Intendant of Montevideo.
 2016 – Population: 1,380,432.
 2019 – Christian Di Candia becomes Intendant of Montevideo.

See also
 Montevideo history
 
 Barrios of Montevideo
 List of Municipal Intendants of Montevideo
 List of Governors of Montevideo, 1751-1817
 List of museums in Montevideo

References

This article incorporates information from the Spanish Wikipedia.

Bibliography
Published in the 19th century
 
 
 
 
 
 
 . Includes description of Montevideo.
 
 

Published in the 20th century
 
 
 
 
 
 
 
 
 
 
 Albes, Edward (1922). Montevideo, the city of roses. Pan American Union online; 29 pp well-illustrated
 
 

Published in the 21st century

External links

Montevideo-related lists
 
Montevideo
Years in Uruguay
Montevideo
Montevideo